Bruce Grove is a London Overground station on the Lea Valley lines located in central Tottenham in the London Borough of Haringey, north London. Its three-letter station code is BCV and it is in Travelcard zone 3.

History
Bruce Grove was originally a stop on the Stoke Newington & Edmonton Railway and opened on 22 July 1872. The station is not far from Bruce Castle and takes its name from a road forming part of the A10.

In the early 1980s several changes were made to the appearance of the station. The wooden covered staircases to both platforms were replaced by open-air concrete staircases. The London-bound platform roof was shortened and the waiting rooms boarded up. The northbound roof opposite (which was identical) was completely removed and a small shelter built of brick was installed in its place. This shelter lasted for nearly 20 years before it was demolished and a new roof, built in the style of the original, although much shorter, was constructed giving the illusion of original authenticity to the station. Haringey council funded the work and the station is considered a site of historic interest in the locality.

In May 2015 the station and all services that call there transferred from Abellio Greater Anglia to become part of the London Overground network.

In November 2015 a major facelift for the station was announced.

Services
Trains are operated by London Overground.

The typical off-peak weekday service pattern from Bruce Grove is:

Connections
London Buses routes 123, 149, 243, 259, 279, 318, 341, 349, 476 and W4 and night routes N279 serve the station.

References

External links

Railway stations in the London Borough of Haringey
Former Great Eastern Railway stations
Railway stations in Great Britain opened in 1872
Railway stations served by London Overground
Buildings and structures in Tottenham